Benjamin Brown French (1800–1870) was a politician, telegraph business leader, Clerk of the U.S. House of Representatives, and Public Commissioner of Buildings in Washington, D.C. He was a member of the New Hampshire legislature from 1831 until 1833. He moved to Washington, D.C., where he served as Clerk of the United States House of Representatives from 1845 until 1847 and was appointed Commissioner of Public Buildings. He compiled an album of salt print and albumen print photographs related to construction of the Capitol dome and other sites. He was also involved in the burgeoning telegraph industry developed by Samuel Morse and others. His journals were published posthumously in edited form as Witness to the Young Republic.

The August 30, 1845, issue of the Baltimore Sun led to the composition of a ballad by French about Luther Fuller who died aboard the steamboat Erie. It was printed on September 5.

French was very active in a number of clubs and societies, particularly Freemasonry.  In the 1850s, he was Grand Master of the Knights Templar of the United States.  He succeeded William S. Wood as Commissioner of Public Buildings in the fall of 1861.

He was present at Abraham Lincoln's inauguration (and was president of the inaugural ball committee), and is reported to have physically restrained John Wilkes Booth, who had gained access to the capitol rotunda, and was trying to push through the crowd. French was also present for the Gettysburg Address, and oversaw Lincoln's funeral. He gave the main speech April 14, 1868, at the dedication of the Abraham Lincoln statue at Washington's City Hall.

He composed a hymn for the consecration of the National Cemetery at Gettysburg.

Amos Tuck French was his great-grandson.

Daniel Chester French, the sculptor of the Statue of Abraham Lincoln at the Lincoln Memorial, was French's nephew.

His journals were donated to the Library of Congress by an heir. His Capitol Hill home had been next to where the library was built. The journals were edited into a book and published as Witness to the Young Republic. Historian Joanne B. Freeman drew extensively upon these journals as a resource when writing her 2018 book, The Field of Blood:  Violence in Congress and the Road to Civil War.

References

Further reading 

 

1800 births
1870 deaths
Clerks of the United States House of Representatives
Members of the New Hampshire General Court
19th-century American politicians
American Freemasons